Dusted is the second album by Skrew, released on May 5, 1994 through Metal Blade Records.

Track listing

Personnel 
Skrew
Clay Campbell – guitar
Mark Dufour – drums
Adam Grossman – vocals, guitar, programming
Mike Robinson – guitar
Jim Vollentine – keyboards, programming
Brandon Workman – electric bass
Production and additional personnel
Tom Baker – mastering
Howie Beno – programming, production, engineering
Brian Liesegang – programming
Jeff Newell – programming, production, engineering
Sir Real Graphics – cover art

References

External links 
 

1994 albums
Metal Blade Records albums
Skrew albums